Senkaku can refer to:
 Senkaku Islands (尖閣列島), disputed territory named "Diaoyu" or "Diaoyutai Islands" in Mandarin Chinese, also known as "Pinnacle Islands", administered by Japan
 , a Japanese Buddhist priest
 , the head of the Yasui school of Go, which was established in 1612
  a shinto sanctuary
 Senkaku, a fictional character in a Japanese manga series, Rurouni Kenshin